Ahmed Osman Hassan is a Somali politician, who is currently serving as the Governor of Sahil region of Somaliland since April 2018.

See also

 Berbera
 Sahil Region
 Governor of Sahil

References

Living people
Governors of Sahil
Year of birth missing (living people)